Julia Perkins Ballard (March 27, 1828 – April 21, 1894) was an author and poet.

Biography
Julia Perkins married Rev. Dr. Addison Ballard on August 7, 1851. He was a prominent minister and scholar.
Ballard moved often as she followed her husband from job to job. Her literary works focused on entomology, temperance, nature, and children's science books. She often used the pen name Kruna when writing temperance fiction.

Ballard wrote temperance fiction in an effort to stop the harsh treatment given to family members of alcoholics. She was motivated to change the social norms surrounding alcoholism. She was also a fanatic about entomology and nature. She wrote many popular children's books under the genre of scientific fiction, the most popular being Among the Moths and Butterflies.

Significant works

 Among the Moths and Butterflies
 Insect Lives, or Born in Prison
 Moths and Butterflies, a revised and enlarged edition of Insect Lives
 Broken Rock
 Building Stones
 The Scarlet Oak and Other Poems with Annie Lenthal Smith
 There's No Light in the Window
 Jem and Velvet
 The Lost Estate
 The Little Golden Keys
 Pleasant Paths for Little Feet

References

1828 births
1894 deaths
American women poets
People from Athens, Ohio
American temperance activists
19th-century American women writers
19th-century pseudonymous writers
Pseudonymous women writers